Fibricola lucida is a fluke that infects Virginia opossums (Didelphis virginiana), American minks (Neogale vison), and marsh rice rats (Oryzomys palustris) in North America. In a study in Florida, F. lucida was the only fluke of the marsh rice rat (among 21 species recorded) that occurred in both the freshwater marsh at Paynes Prairie and the saltwater marsh at Cedar Key. At the former locality, it infected 11% of rice rats and the number of worms per infected rat ranged from 1 to 65, averaging 17. At Cedar Key, 67% of rice rats were infected and the number of worms per infected rat ranged from 1 to 1975, averaging 143.

See also 
List of parasites of the marsh rice rat

References

Literature cited 
 Kinsella, J.M. 1988. Comparison of helminths of rice rats, Oryzomys palustris, from freshwater and saltwater marshes in Florida. Proceedings of the Helminthological Society of Washington 55(2):275–280.
 Kontrimavichus, V.L. 1985. Helminths of mustelids and trends in their evolution. Amerind Publishing Company, 607 pp.

Digenea
Parasitic animals of mammals